Axel Karl Petersen (December 10, 1887 in Copenhagen – December 20, 1968 in Copenhagen) was a Danish amateur football (soccer) player, who played in the midfielder position. He played two games for the Denmark national football team, and won a silver medal at the 1912 Summer Olympics.

He most notably represented Copenhagen club Boldklubben Frem, made his Danish national team debut in October 1911, and was selected for the Danish team at the 1912 Summer Olympics. He played one match at the tournament, the 7-0 win against Norway in the first round, as Denmark won silver medals. This was to be his last national team game.

References

External links
Danish national team profile
DatabaseOlympics profile

1887 births
1968 deaths
Danish men's footballers
Denmark international footballers
Boldklubben Frem players
Footballers at the 1912 Summer Olympics
Olympic footballers of Denmark
Olympic silver medalists for Denmark
Olympic medalists in football
Medalists at the 1912 Summer Olympics
Association football midfielders
Footballers from Copenhagen